Blood for the Master is the fifth studio album by American blackened death metal band Goatwhore.

Track listing

Personnel 
Goatwhore
 Ben Falgoust – lead vocals
 Sammy Duet – guitars, backing vocals
 James Harvey – bass, backing vocals
 Zack Simmons – drums

Additional personnel
 Erik Rutan – production, guitar solo on intro to "Embodiment of This Bitter Chaos"
 Brian Elliott – additional engineering
 Robert Coldwell – additional engineering
 Jordan Barlow – artwork

References 

2012 albums
Goatwhore albums
Metal Blade Records albums
Albums produced by Erik Rutan